Alexey Orlov may refer to:

Alexei Grigoryevich Orlov (1737–1808), Russian count
Aleksey Orlov (politician) (born 1961), Russian politician
Aleksei Orlov (footballer) (born 1997), Russian footballer
Alexey Fyodorovich Orlov (1787–1862), Russian diplomat